Stephanie "Step" Vaessen (born 11 February 1965) is a Dutch broadcast journalist, currently working as a Berlin correspondent for Al Jazeera English.

Early life
Vaessen is of Dutch origin and was born in Simpelveld in the province of Limburg, in 1965.

She graduated in psychology in Nijmegen and then took a postgraduate course in journalism in Tilburg.
During her student years, she was involved in the Nijmegen squatter movement, and worked on the squatter radio-station Radio Rataplan.

Career
Nederlandse Omroep Stichtin
In 1994, she began working with the Nederlandse Omroep Stichting (NOS) news department. 
In 1996 she became the NOS Southeast Asia correspondent, based in Jakarta.

Al Jazeera
Vaessen moved to Al Jazeera English in 2006, when it was founded. She was based in Jakarta as the station's correspondent for Indonesia.

Guest appearances
On Sunday, August 7, 2011, she was the third guest for the 2011 season on the television programme Zomergasten on the Dutch channel VPRO. On 20 June 2012, she was the speaker for the Arondéus Lecture, to discuss the theme of intolerance in the Netherlands and attempts by politicians to limit free speech.

Publications
 Jihad met sambal, August 2011 (Prometheus : Amsterdam).

External links 
 Profile of Step Vaessen on the website NOS Journaal in the Internet Archive
 De wandeling met Step Vaessen in the Internet Archive
 Profile of Step Vaessen on the Al Jazeera English website

1965 births
Living people
Dutch expatriates in Germany
Dutch expatriates in Indonesia
Dutch expatriates in Russia
Dutch journalists
Dutch women journalists
People from Simpelveld
Radboud University Nijmegen alumni
20th-century squatters